Dauniškis is a lake located in Dauniškis park, Utena city, Lithuania. It has a length of 0.7 km and maximum width of 0.3 km.

References
  

Lakes of Lithuania